Calumma vohibola is a species of chameleon found in Madagascar.

References

Calumma
Reptiles of Madagascar
Reptiles described in 2011
Taxa named by Miguel Vences
Taxa named by Frank Glaw